Luke Beaufort (born 14 April 2001) is a South African cricketer. He made his List A debut on 21 March 2021, for Eastern Province in the 2020–21 CSA Provincial One-Day Challenge. Prior to his List A debut, he was named in South Africa's squad for the 2020 Under-19 Cricket World Cup.

References

External links
 

2001 births
Living people
South African cricketers
Eastern Province cricketers
Place of birth missing (living people)